Chaonan is a district of Shantou, Guangdong province, People's Republic of China.

The District includes the Xiashan Subdistrict and the towns of Jingdu, Longtian, Leiling, Chengtian, Hongchang, Lugang, Liangying, Xiancheng, Chendian, and Simapu.

Transportation
The currently under construction Chaonan railway station, on the Shantou–Shanwei high-speed railway, will serve the district.

Shantou
County-level divisions of Guangdong